Ricardo Magno Virtuoso Guarà (born 1 March 1984 in Guarapuava, Brazil) is a former Brazilian footballer and current futsal player.

Career

Club 
Virtuoso played in the youth systems of Guaratinguetá/SP and Clube Atlético Juventus. He signed with Swiss second division side FC Chiasso in 2004 and played two seasons there. On 18 May 2006, Virtuoso signed with the Columbus Crew, and was with the team until he was waived in March 2008. He returned in summer 2009 to sign with SC Zofingen, who played under his real name Ricardo Guara. After one season with SC Zofingen, returned for one season to his first Swiss club FC Chiasso. After the season 2010/2011, Virtuoso left Swiss and returned to Brazil.

International 
Virtuoso has also been a member of the U-17 Brazilian national team.

Futsal 
After the end of his contract 2011 with Swiss side FC Chiasso, Virtuoso joined Brazilian Futsal club Valenga/Juventude Futsal.

Notes

1984 births
Living people
Brazilian footballers
Brazilian expatriate footballers
Columbus Crew players
Expatriate footballers in Switzerland
FC Chiasso players
Expatriate soccer players in the United States
Brazilian men's futsal players
People from Guarapuava
Major League Soccer players
Association football midfielders
Sportspeople from Paraná (state)